Brønshøj, part of the municipality of Copenhagen, forms, together with Husum, the administrative city district (bydel) of Brønshøj-Husum, in Denmark.

History
The first mention of the village Brønshøj (Brunshoga), is in a letter dated October 21, 1186 from Pope Urban III to Archbishop Absalon. Brønshøj Church dates from approximately the same time.

In 1658-1660, during The Northern Wars, the village and its immediate surroundings were transformed into a military fortress and town, named Carlstad by the Swedish Army under the command of King Karl X Gustav. This town supported the Swedish siege of Copenhagen. The population reached c. 30,000, which was the same as that of Copenhagen itself. The siege ended on the death of Karl X Gustav, 13 February 1660. Evidence of the fortifications cannot be found in the landscape today, though many artifacts have been uncovered. Artifacts and models of Carlstad and the events surrounding its creation are found at Brønshøj Museum.

During the late part of the 19th century and early part of the 20th century the rural village developed into a suburb of the growing metropolis of Copenhagen. In 1901, Brønshøj, together with several of the neighboring villages, was incorporated into the municipality of Copenhagen. Brønshøj contains some important examples of Danish housing types. In 1899, the cooperative housing area of Enigheden was begun as worker housing for the local dairy: this was followed in 1923 by the English Garden Village. In the 1950s, Denmark's first significant high-rise housing was built at Bellahøj. The great Danish landscape architect C.Th. Sørensen lived in one of the penthouses, known as rooftop villas, until his death. C.Th. Sørensen and architect Steen Eiler Rasmussen also planned the housing area Tingbjerg (near Utterslev Mose) between the late 1950s and early 1970s, and was constructed on the English architectural concept (of the times) of having a village within the city.

Topography and Transport
Brønshøj lies on rising ground 4 km west of Copenhagen center and is bordered by the large wetland area of Utterslev Mose and Tingbjerg to the north. A number of ponds, lakes, and parks characterise Brønshøj. On its eastern edge, the ridgeline of Bellahøj provides extensive views over Copenhagen.

Today, Brønshøj is not served by the S-train and Metro networks, but the City bus connects the area to the core of Copenhagen, which can be reached within 20 minutes by car, bus or bicycle. In the most significant current development, small workshops, car lots and other single-storey buildings are being demolished and replaced with new housing blocks, often over shops, along Brønshøj's main street, Frederiksundsvej.  However, the area maintains a distinctive character generated by its topography, parks, and housing architecture.

Sport
Brønshøj Boldklub play at the Tingbjerg Idrætspark.

External links 
 Brønshøj Museum
 Brønshøj - from village to large suburb (fra landsby til storbyforstad) (in Danish)

Brønshøj-Husum
Copenhagen city districts